Undercurrent is the fourth studio album by American singer–songwriter Sarah Jarosz. The album was released in 2016 by Sugar Hill Records. The album and one song were nominated for three Grammy Awards, winning two.

Critical reception

Thom Jurek of AllMusic writes that "Jarosz reaches through her musical and personal histories with vulnerability and willingness. She comes out on the other side with songs that possess narrative savvy, melodic invention, and a refreshing sense of self-assuredness". Jim Fusilli of the Wall Street Journal finds her "country–flavored folk songs" to be "direct, unadorned and thoroughly beautiful".

Accolades
In 2016 the album won the Grammy for Best Folk Album and was nominated for Best Engineered Album, Non-Classical. The song "House of Mercy" received the Grammy for Best American Roots Performance at the 59th Annual Grammy Awards.

Track listing

Personnel
 Sarah Jarosz – vocals, acoustic and electric guitars, octave mandolin, banjo
 Luke Reynolds – acoustic and electric guitars, pedal steel, vocals
 Jedd Hughes – acoustic and electric guitars, vocals
 Mark Schatz – bass guitar

Additional musicians
 Parker Millsap – acoustic guitar, vocals (track 6)
 Tim Lauer – B3 organ (track 6)
 Aoife O'Donovan – guitar, vocals (track 10)
 Sara Watkins – fiddle (track 10)

Technical personnel
 Gary Paczosa and Sarah Jarosz  – producers 
 Gary Paczosa and Shani Gandhi  – engineers
 Gary Paczosa – mixing
 Paul Blakemore – mastering

Charts

References

External links

2016 albums
Sarah Jarosz albums
Sugar Hill Records albums